Bernard Cowan (June 11, 1922 – July 17, 1990) was a Canadian actor, producer and writer. He was born in Vancouver, British Columbia. He was occasionally credited under his nickname, Bunny Cowan, such as on the production Willy McBean and His Magic Machine. His name was pronounced with emphasis on the first syllable of "Bernard" and last name as "cow in".

Cowan worked as the announcer on many CBC television series such as The Pierre Berton Show, Front Page Challenge and Wayne and Shuster. He also worked on such animated series as Spider-Man, The Marvel Super Heroes, Rocket Robin Hood, The King Kong Show, and the Christmas special Rudolph the Red-Nosed Reindeer.

Bernard Cowan was the father of the Canadian disc jockey and voice actor Rob Cowan.

External links

 

1922 births
1990 deaths
Canadian male voice actors
Canadian male television actors
Canadian television writers
Canadian male television writers
Canadian television producers
Canadian television personalities
Place of death missing
Male actors from Vancouver
Writers from Vancouver
Canadian casting directors
Canadian voice directors
20th-century Canadian screenwriters